Frederick Green (12 November 1900 – 15 September 1983) was an Australian politician and a member of the New South Wales Legislative Assembly from 1950 until 1968. He was a member of the Labor Party (ALP).

Green was born in Sydney and educated to elementary level at state schools. He was the son of a metal dealer and worked variously as a brick carter, concrete labourer and law clerk. He joined the Labor party in 1927 and was an alderman on the Alexandria Municipal Council between 1934 and 1948. He was the mayor in 1937, 1938 and 1945. Green was elected to the New South Wales Parliament as the Labor member for the seat of Redfern at the 1950 state election after the sitting Labor member Kevin Dwyer lost party pre-selection and retired.  He retained the seat for the Labor Party at the next 5 elections and retired at the 1968 election when the seat was abolished. Green was the Labor Party whip between 1953 and 1959.

Green is the Great-grandfather of Australian Netballer Kimberlee Green. The Green Square area of the former municipality of Alexandria was named after his son Mick Green.

References

 

1900 births
1983 deaths
Members of the New South Wales Legislative Assembly
Australian Labor Party members of the Parliament of New South Wales
20th-century Australian politicians
Mayors of Alexandria, New South Wales